Honeysuckles are vines in the genus Lonicera

Honeysuckle can also refer to:

Plants

from Australia
Banksia aquilonia, honeysuckle 
Banksia integrifolia, honeysuckle, honeysuckle oak, white honeysuckle 
Banksia marginata, honeysuckle 
Banksia serrata, honeysuckle, red honeysuckle 
Grevillea striata, silvery honeysuckle
Helicia ferruginea, a species of the genus Helicia, hairy honeysuckle
Lambertia multiflora, honeysuckle
Lambertia rariflora, a species of the genus Lambertia, green honeysuckle
Triunia youngiana, a species of the genus Triunia, honeysuckle bush, native honeysuckle

from elsewhere
Knightia excelsa, (Rewarewa) the New Zealand honeysuckle tree
Leycesteria formosa, Himalayan honeysuckle
Tecoma capensis, Cape honeysuckle from southern Africa

Other
Flame palmettes in architecture.
"Chevrefoil", a Breton lai by Marie de France, called "Honeysuckle" in English
Honeysuckle Weeks, British actress
Honeysuckle Creek Tracking Station, a NASA tracking station near Canberra, Australia.
Honeysuckle, Newcastle, NSW, Australia, an urban renewal project
The Wild Honey Suckle, a 1786 poem by Philip Frebeau
 Honeysuckle (film), a 1938 Argentine film
Honeysuckle (horse), Irish-trained racehorse

See also
Honeysuckle Rose (disambiguation)